Haakon Sigurdsson (1147 – 7 July 1162), also known as Haakon Herdebrei, was King of Norway (being Haakon II) from 1157 until 1162 during the Civil war era in Norway.

Biography
His nickname, Herdebrei, means broad-shouldered. An illegitimate son of Sigurd Munn, in 1157 he was named heir of his uncle Eystein II, who had been co-ruler of Norway together with his brothers Inge Haraldsson and Sigurd Munn. Inge had become the sole ruler of Norway after the death of Eystein and Sigurd Munn.

The former supporters of Sigurd Munn and Eystein II united behind Haakon, renewing the fight against Inge under the leadership of Sigurd Håvardsson of Hedmark. On 3 February 1161, King Inge I was defeated and killed while leading his men into battle against Haakon II near Oslo, after many of his men, led by his vassal Godred II Olafsson, defected to Haakon’s side.

On 7 July 1162 King Haakon II was killed in the Battle of Sekken not far from the market town Veøya in Romsdalen.  After Inge’s fall, his supporters had rallied behind the lendmann Erling Skakke and his son, Magnus Erlingsson. Haakon II was succeeded as king of Norway by King Magnus V.

Historic context

The Civil war era in Norway extended over a 110-year period. It started with the death of King Sigurd I of Norway in 1130 and ended with the death of Duke Skule Baardsson in 1240.  During this period there were several interlocked conflicts of varying scale and intensity. The background for these conflicts were the unclear Norwegian succession laws, social conditions and the struggle between Church and King. There were then two main parties, firstly known by varying names or no names at all, but finally condensed into parties of Bagler and Birkebeiner. The rallying point regularly was a royal son, who was set up as the head figure of the party in question, to oppose the rule of king from the contesting party.

References

Other sources
Krag, Claus  Norges historie fram til 1319 (Oslo, 2000)

1147 births
1162 deaths
12th-century Norwegian monarchs
Norwegian civil wars
House of Gille
Monarchs who died as children
Medieval child monarchs
Monarchs killed in action
Norwegian military personnel killed in the Norwegian civil wars